New Seasons Market is a chain of privately owned grocery stores operating in the Portland, Oregon metro area, southwestern Washington, and northern California. Some of the products offered are organic and produced locally in the Pacific Northwest, but conventional groceries are also sold.

Founded locally in 1999, the company was majority acquired by private equity firm Endeavour Capital in 2013 and purchased California-based New Leaf Community Markets in 2013. In 2019, a deal was announced to sell New Seasons Market to Good Food Holdings, a subsidiary of South Korean retail conglomerate E-mart.

The company currently operates 19 stores in the greater Portland/Vancouver metropolitan area, including Hillsboro, Beaverton, Happy Valley, Vancouver, Tualatin, and Lake Oswego; and one store in San Jose, California. The company has faced criticism and a worker unionization drive starting in 2022 has led 5 Portland-area stores to vote to unionize and the National Labor Relations Board to charge New Seasons Market with unfair labor practices in regard to anti-union activity.

History
New Seasons was founded in Portland, Oregon, in 1999 by three families of 50 people.  By 2008, it had grown to nine stores and about 1,800 employees. By November 2013, New Seasons had grown to 15 stores and 3,000 employees, when it purchased California-based New Leaf Community Markets and New Leaf founder Scott Roseman joined the New Seasons Board.

In November 2013, Endeavour Capital invested $17.5M in New Seasons Market, according to SEC filings. Bradaigh Wagner and Stephen Babson, managing directors at Endeavour, now sit on the board of New Seasons Market. In 2013, New Seasons became the first grocery store in the world to be certified as a B Corporation. B Corp certification is issued by global non-profit B Lab to for-profit companies meeting social sustainability, environmental performance, accountability, and transparency standards. The company earned re-certification in 2015 and 2017. In December 2017, New Seasons Market employees and the Northwest Accountability Project asked B Lab to review the company's certification based on claims of anti-union activity and Endeavour's financial ties to the M.J. Murdock Charitable Trust.

In February 2018 CEO, Wendy Collie stepped down amid a failed expansion into California and an active employee union organizing campaign. Also in February 2018, two New Leaf stores in California ended their franchisee relationship with the company citing “big changes at the company”.

In December 2019, parent company Endeavour Capital announced that it would be selling the grocery chain to E-mart, specifically to its subsidiary, Good Food Holdings, in a sale transaction that was finalized in early 2020. Details of the transaction include the retention of CEO Forrest Hoffmaster who will continue running the business, the continuance of the organization as a B Corp, the halt of existing plans for expanding the chain, and the closure of the store located in the Ballard neighborhood in Seattle. Nancy Lebold joined New Seasons Market as CEO in April 2021, bringing experience in operations, merchandising and procurement from grocers including Kroger's Food 4 Less and WinCo Foods.

In May 2022, employees at stores in the Portland metropolitan area began attempts towards seeking unionization. Employees cited "changes to the company's culture and business ethics" as primary reasons behind why they began organizing. In late May 2022, New Seasons hired Ogletree Deakins, a law firm that often assists companies in campaigns against union drives, claiming the firm would help them "navigate the nuances of federal labor law.". In August 2022 survey results released by Forbes Magazine in collaboration with Statista, the company was ranked 3rd overall out of employers in Oregon.

The National Labor Relations Board charged New Seasons with unfair labor practices in January 2023 after employees in collaboration with the United Food & Commercial Workers Local 555 filed complaints and claimed that the company had "unlawfully threatened to rescind benefits and rewards to employees that they had been receiving in the event the employees unionized."

Stores 

 Arbor Lodge is located in North Portland. Built from the ground up in 2005, Arbor Lodge is located next to the Yellow MAX line at N. Rosa Parks Way and Interstate Avenue.
 Cedar Hills is located in a former roller skating rink at Cedar Hills Crossing shopping center. Opened in 2006.
 Concordia in Northeast Portland, is located near Concordia University in the neighborhood by the same name. Constructed and opened in 2001 at NE 33rd & Killingsworth.
 Fisher's Landing opened in October 2011 in Vancouver, becoming the first New Seasons Market store outside Oregon, in a former Albertsons LLC retail store.
 Grant Park is located at NE 32nd and Broadway in the Grant Park Village development. It opened in November 2014.
 Happy Valley is located in a suburb east of Portland. Opened 2007 at 157th & Sunnyside Road.
 Hawthorne opened in October 2010 at SE 40th & Hawthorne in the Richmond neighborhood, on the site where the vegetarian Daily Grind Natural Foods and the Urban Onion deli, both owned by Seventh-day Adventists once stood. They opened in 1973 and closed in 2007 amidst rumors of nonpayment.
 Mountain Park opened in 2006 at a long-disused Thriftway in the Portland suburb of Lake Oswego.
 Nyberg Rivers is located in a redeveloped shopping center in Tualatin. It opened in October 2014.
 Orenco Station is located in Hillsboro is part of a development near the Westside MAX. Opened in 2001 as the third store in the chain. 
 Palisades is New Seasons' second store in Lake Oswego, opened in 2022. 
 Progress Ridge is located in the Tigard/Beaverton area. Opened in 2011.
 Raleigh Hills is New Seasons Market's first store, opened in 1999, a former Kienow's grocery store site.
 Sellwood is New Seasons Market's second store, on the corner of the Sellwood antique district. The building used to house a Piggly Wiggly, as portrayed within the paint of the store's inside.
 Seven Corners opened in 2004 in a remodeled Red Apple grocery and laundromat. It is located in Southeast Portland neighborhood of Hosford-Abernethy, at the seven corners formed by the intersection of SE Division Street, SE Ladd Avenue, and SE 20th Avenue on the southeast corner of Ladd's Addition.
 Slabtown is located on a former Con-way site at NW 21st and Raleigh in the Northwest District. It opened in August 2015.
 University Park is located at N Lombard and N Westanna in North Portland. It opened in March 2016.
 Williams is located in the Eliot neighborhood of North Portland. Opened in August 2013.
 Woodstock is located at SE Woodstock and 45th. It opened in October 2015.

Former 
 Evergreen in San Jose, California, was a rebranded New Leaf Community Markets store, and the first New Seasons location outside of the Portland metropolitan area. The store rebranded to Silver Creek Community Market by New Leaf in January 2023.
Ballard, Seattle, opened in May 2018 on Ballard Way. This is the second store in the greater Seattle area. This location closed in 2019 as part of the sale of the company to e-mart.
 Mercer Island opened in November 2016 in Mercer Island, Washington, and was the first store in the greater Seattle area. This location closed in 2019.
Sunnyvale was located at 760 E El Camino Real, between Remington and Wolfe in Sunnyvale, CA (closed Feb 2018).
 Emeryville, scheduled to open in 2018, was to be the anchor tenant of the Emeryville Public Market. In Feb 2018 it was announced they were pulling out of the project before construction was completed, as well as closing the nearby Sunnyvale store.

Community

GMO labeling 
After encouraging vendors to voluntarily certify their products as GMO free in 2013, New Seasons publicly endorsed the GMO labeling campaign, Oregon Right to Know, in 2014, with continued public advocacy for non-GMO labeling and certification in 2017

Wage initiatives 
In 2015, New Seasons took a vocal position in support of raising the minimum wage in Oregon, raising starting wages at all stores to $12 an hour, and testifying at the Oregon State Senate hearings in 2016 in support of raising minimum wage across the state. New Seasons announced pay increases again in 2018, raising minimum pay to $15 across every region, effective February 2019. New Seasons raised starting wages again in October 2021 to $16.25 an hour.

Controversies

Gentrification contributions
When New Seasons opened stores in the North Williams and St. Johns neighborhoods of Portland, some residents questioned if the stores would contribute to the gentrification of these historically black and working-class neighborhoods. In an interview with The Oregonian newspaper in 2015 former head of store development, Jerry Chevasuss said that the grocery store targets neighborhoods in the process of gentrification, and that often the addition of a New Seasons will push rents and home values higher, adding to that process.

Some long-time Seattle residents voiced concerns that a planned store in the Central District, a formerly red-lined, historically black, neighborhood in Seattle currently undergoing rapid gentrification, would cater to new residents and not serve existing communities.

Unionization

2017 
In October 2017 Portland-based employees at New Seasons Market formed the group New Seasons Workers United and launched a public campaign to improve working conditions at their stores. Employees cited changes implemented since Endeavour Capital acquired majority ownership as a major impetus for organizing. Subsequently, New Seasons Market hired the union-avoidance firm Cruz and Associates, notable for its unsuccessful contract with Trump Hotels to prevent unionization of the hotel's employees. New Seasons Market faced criticism and two National Labor Relations Board charges alleging illegal retaliation when they fired two employees who had appeared in a union flyer. The charges were later dismissed. Future Oregon Governor Tina Kotek rallied with employees outside of the Arbor Lodge location in support of unionization.

2022-present 
In May 2022, employees at stores in the Portland metropolitan area began attempts towards seeking unionization, organizing separately with the newly founded independent New Seasons Labor Union and UFCW Local 555, with the NSLU being founded with the intention of unionized workers being independent from the UFCW. New Seasons Market in response, for the second time, hired a lawyer from a law firm that previously had experience advising businesses associated with Donald Trump, Ogletree, Deakins, Nash, Smoak & Stewart. The law firm also was previously hired by Powell's Books during worker unionizations. The Seven Corners location filed with the National Labor Relations Board under New Seasons Labor Union, and the Orenco Station location filed through the representation of the UFCW.

On June 23, 2022, workers at the Sellwood location filed with the NLRB under representation from the NSLU to unionize. Workers at the Slabtown in downtown Portland location also filed on August 15. On September 1, 2022, workers represented by the UFCW lost the union election at the Orenco Station store in Hillsboro by a vote of 60 to 37.

On September 7, 2022, workers represented by the NSLU won the union election at the Seven Corners store, marking the first ever New Seasons Market to vote to unionize, by a vote of 62 to 15. Just a day later, workers at the Sellwood location represented by the NSLU lost their union election by a vote of 33 to 29. On September 16, 2022, workers under the NSLU at the Woodstock location filed to unionize, and in October 2022 staff represented by the NSLU at the Concordia and Grant Park locations also filed.

On October 14, 2022, representatives from the United Food and Commercial Workers filed unfair labor practice complaints with the National Labor Relations Board alleging that New Seasons Market engaged in retaliatory tactics and fired an employee at the Orenco Station location that was involved in unionizing workers. On October 20, 2022, workers at the Slabtown location under the NSLU voted to unionize by a vote of 62–14. On November 15, 2022, workers at the Arbor Lodge location filed to unionize,
and by November 28, 2022, over half of all New Seasons Market stores had filed to unionize, with 10 of 19 filing with the National Labor Relations Board, with workers at the Cedar Hills location in Beaverton, Oregon, filing to unionize under the NSLU on that same day.

On December 9, 2022, workers under the NSLU at the Woodstock location voted to unionize by a vote of 80–18, and on December 13, 2022, the Grant Park location voted to unionize by a vote of 72–22, and as of January 4, 2023, five locations are now unionized.

On January 13, 2023, it was found by the National Labor Relations Board that New Seasons Market engaged in unfair labor practices in regard to their attempts to stop union activities at the Orenco Station store. According to a union representative, the company threatened employees based on benefits availability in regard to unionizing. New Seasons Market released a statement disagreeing with the National Labor Relations Board findings. An April 2023 hearing will decide if another unionization vote is to occur at Orenco Station, which will nullify the previous vote that failed.

References

External links

New Seasons Market Official Site

Privately held companies based in Oregon
Companies based in Portland, Oregon
Supermarkets of the United States
Retail companies established in 1999
1999 establishments in Oregon
Certified B Corporations in the Food & Beverage Industry